Jan Vopat (born March 22, 1973) is a Czech former professional ice hockey player who played 126 games in the National Hockey League with the Los Angeles Kings and Nashville Predators between 1996 and 1999. He is the older brother of former NHL centre, Roman Vopat. Internationally he played for the Czech national team at several tournaments, including the 1994 Winter Olympics.

Career statistics

Regular season and playoffs

International

External links
 

1973 births
Living people
Czech ice hockey defencemen
Czechoslovak ice hockey defencemen
HC Litvínov players
Hartford Whalers draft picks
Ice hockey players at the 1994 Winter Olympics
Los Angeles Kings players
Los Angeles Kings scouts
Milwaukee Admirals (IHL) players
Nashville Predators players
Olympic ice hockey players of the Czech Republic
Sportspeople from Most (city)
Phoenix Roadrunners (IHL) players
St. Louis Blues scouts
Utah Grizzlies (IHL) players
Czech expatriate ice hockey players in the United States
Czech expatriate ice hockey players in Finland
Czech expatriate ice hockey players in Germany